Richard Boris Ford (1 July 1917, in Simla, India – 19 May 1998, in London, England), was a literary critic, writer, editor and educationist.

Early life

The son of an Indian Army officer, Brigadier Geoffrey Noel Ford, and his Russian wife Ekaterina, Ford was a chorister at King's College, Cambridge, eventually becoming head chorister under Boris Ord. He was then educated at Gresham's School, and through his English master there, Denys Thompson, was introduced to F.R. Leavis under whom he studied at Downing College, Cambridge. Even before graduating, Ford's essay on Wuthering Heights was published by Leavis in Scrutiny in March 1939. Although he came to share many of Leavis's ideas, Ford could not follow Leavis in making "exclusion and exclusivity major features of [Leavis's] critical policy". Ford had an increasingly stormy relationship with Leavis and his wife Q. D.: at one point, Q. D. wrote to him "Mrs Leavis informs Mr Ford that he is no longer an acceptable visitor to her house. Any communications from him will not be answered."

Career
After Cambridge, Ford joined the army, and from 1940 until the end of the Second World War was the officer commanding the Middle East School of Artistic Studies. He then became chief editor and director of the Army Bureau of Current Affairs (ABCA). So critical of Britain were ABCA's seminars addressed to officers and men that Ford attracted the attention of MI5. Indeed, Ford believed that the Labour Party came to power in 1945 as a result of ABCA's democratizing influence.

In 1951 Ford became information officer of UNESCO's technical assistance board. In 1953 he was invited by W. E. Williams, who had been a colleague at ABCA, to edit a multi-authored seven-volume Pelican Guide to English Literature (1954–61; revised, 1982–8). This was indebted in many senses to Leavis, who, when he closed Scrutiny in 1953, remarked bitterly that Ford had "approached my main people", and considered that some of the Pelican Guide essays were derivative. Nonetheless, the series broke new ground: notably the first volume, The Age of Chaucer, included a 200-page anthology of non-Chaucerian medieval poetry in original texts, so introducing early English poetry to several contemporary poets.

Ford became Associated Rediffusion's first head of schools broadcasting (1957–58), during which time he persuaded Benjamin Britten to compose his church opera Noye's Fludde for a series of programmes. However, Ford was dismissed before the opera was produced, on the grounds that Ford was "not suitable for the post". However, other accounts suggest that his dismissal came following his objection to the broadcast of unsuitable advertisements between programmes, and to the cancellation of school broadcasts to accommodate afternoon horse racing in the schedules.

In 1957–8 Ford was Education Secretary to the Cambridge University Press. He then became Professor of Education and Director of the Institute of Education at University of Sheffield from 1960 to 1963, when he became Professor of Education at Sussex University (1963–73). At Sussex, with the support of Asa Briggs, he helped establish a music department in 1971 with Donald Mitchell as visiting Professor of Music. While at Sussex, Ford was Dean at the School of Cultural and Community Studies (1963–71). After leaving Sussex in 1973, Ford became Professor of Education at Bristol until 1982.

The Pelican Guide to English Literature series was followed by the even more ambitious The Cambridge Guide to the Arts in Britain (in nine volumes, 1988–91).

Family

He was married twice. With his first wife, Noreen, he had two daughters and a son, and was the step father to Noreen's daughter by her first marriage. He was the step father to the two daughters of his second wife, Inge.

Publications

 Medieval Literature: Chaucer and the alliterative tradition: with an anthology of Medieval poems and drama, ed. Boris Ford (1982)
 A series for Pelican Books entitled The New Pelican Guide to English Literature
 The New Pelican Guide to English Literature, Vol. 1: The Age of Chaucer ed. Boris Ford 
 The New Pelican Guide to English Literature: Medieval Literature ed. Boris Ford (updated edition) 
 The New Pelican Guide to English Literature, Vol. 2, The Age of Shakespeare, ed. Boris Ford 
 The New Pelican Guide to English Literature, Vol. 3: From Donne to Marvell ed. Boris Ford 
 The New Pelican Guide to English Literature, Vol. 4: From Dryden to Johnson, ed. Boris Ford (1957)  
 The New Pelican Guide to English Literature, Vol. 5: From Blake to Byron (Pelican Books, 1957).  
 The New Pelican Guide to English Literature, Vol. 6: From Dickens to Hardy (Pelican Books, 1957).  .
 The New Pelican Guide to English Literature, Vol. 7: The Modern Age, James to Eliot, ed. Boris Ford (Penguin, 1990)
 The New Pelican Guide to English Literature, Vol. 8 The Present: From Orwell to Naipaul
 The New Pelican Guide to English Literature: Vol. 9: American Literature ed. Boris Ford
 The Cambridge Guide to the Arts in Britain, Vol 2: The Middle Ages ed. Boris Ford (Cambridge University Press, 1988)
 The Cambridge Guide to the Arts in Britain: The Seventeenth Century, ed. Boris Ford (Cambridge University Press)
 The Cambridge Cultural History of Great Britain: Early Britain (1988) ed. Boris Ford
 Romantics to Early Victorians, ed. Boris Ford (Cambridge University Press, 1990)
 The Cambridge Cultural History of Great Britain, Volume 8, ed. Boris Ford (Cambridge University Press, 1992)
 The Cambridge Cultural History of Great Britain, Volume 9, Modern Britain, ed. Boris Ford (Cambridge University Press, 1992)
 Benjamin Britten's Poets (1994)

Editor of Journals
 1951–1968 Co-editor of The Use of English with David Holbrook, Denys Thompson, and Raymond O'Malley
 1955–1958 Editor of the Journal of Education 1955–1986 Editor of Universities Quarterly''

References

Obituary at Sussex University official site

External links
Cambridge Cultural History of Great Britain Cambridge University Press

1917 births
1998 deaths
Alumni of Downing College, Cambridge
Academics of the University of Bristol
Academics of the University of Sussex
British Army personnel of World War II
English literary critics
People educated at Gresham's School
British people in colonial India